Opera Noir is the sixth studio album by Austrian heavy metal band Stahlhammer, released on 3 March 2006. The album follows the "Stahlhammer tradition" with cover songs of David Bowie's "Heroes/Helden" and Phil Collins's "In the Air Tonight".

Track listing 
 Vienna – 4:41
 Wie es ist (How it is) – 2:58
 Opera Noir (Black opera) – 4:23
 Kalt wie Eis (Cold as ice) – 4:18
 In the Air Tonight – 5:10 (Phil Collins cover)
 Tod a capella (Death a capella) – 4:29
 Das schreiende Herz (The screaming heart) – 3:45
 La Paloma (The Dove) – 3:56 (Hans Albers cover)
 Krieger morden nicht (Warriors don't murder) – 3:12
 Jazz – 3:23
 Mensch (Human) – 2:30
 Der alte Mann (The old man) – 3:40
 Heroes/Helden – 5:39 (David Bowie cover)

References 

 http://www.spirit-of-metal.com/album-groupe-Stahlhammer-nom_album-Opera_Noir-l-en.html
 http://www.stahlhammer.org/v4/discography/albums/operanoir.php
 http://www.stahlhammer.org/v4/info/index.php

2006 albums
Stahlhammer albums